Robert Allerton (died 19 April 1437) was a Canon of Windsor from 1432 to 1437.

Career

He was appointed:
Prebendary of Cropredy in Lincoln 1420
Rector of Amersham 1420
Prebendary of Ripon 1420
Prebendary of Bracklesham in Chichester 
 
He was appointed to the eleventh stall in St George's Chapel, Windsor Castle in 1432 and held the canonry until 1437.

Notes 

1437 deaths
Canons of Windsor
Year of birth unknown